Andrea Romanò  (born 23 July 1993) is an Italian footballer who plays as a midfielder.

Career
Romanò made his debut for Internazionale in the Europa League on 22 November 2012 against FC Rubin Kazan. In January 2013 he joined A.C. Prato on temporary base.

In June 2013 Romanò and Andrea Bandini were part of the deal that Alessandro Capello went to Inter. On 5 July Romanò was loaned out to Serie B side Crotone for the 2013–14 season. In January 2014 Romanò returned to Prato. In June 2014 Romanò, Bandini and Capello were sold back to their mother clubs. Romanò signed a new 4-year contract.

In July 2014 Romanò returned to Prato once again along with Roberto Ogunseye, Adama Fofana and Gianmarco Gabbianelli.

On 24 July 2015, Romanò was signed by A.C. Renate in another temporary deal.

On 31 August 2016, Romanò left for Reggina. On 13 July 2017 he left for Monza.

On 30 August 2018, Romanò was loaned to Serie C side Cuneo on a season-long loan deal.

On 31 January 2019, Romanò was loaned to Südtirol until the end of season.

Honours
Inter Primavera
 NextGen series (1): 2011–12
 League Champion (1): 2011–12

References

External links

1993 births
Sportspeople from Como
Living people
Italian footballers
Italy youth international footballers
Inter Milan players
A.C. Prato players
F.C. Crotone players
A.C. Renate players
A.C. Monza players
A.C. Cuneo 1905 players
F.C. Südtirol players
Serie C players
Association football midfielders
Footballers from Lombardy